Act One is the debut album of the Scottish progressive band Beggars Opera.

Overview
Variously classified as symphonic rock, progressive rock or proto-progressive rock, Beggars Opera's debut album has been compared to (and sometimes described as "derivative of") works by The Nice and Deep Purple MK I. It was published by Vertigo (which had at the time introduced its legendary "swirl" label) in 1970 and features cover art by the renowned surrealist photographer and artist Marcus Keef (the same that created the covers for Black Sabbath's first three albums). In the same year the band also released a somewhat successful single, "Sarabande", which was not included in the album in its original LP edition, but appears in the CD reissue.

The album includes many elements of symphonic progressive rock, including a number of references to classical music (e.g.,Poet and Peasant and Light Cavalry by Franz von Suppé and Grieg's Peer Gynt), an Emerson-esque keyboard section featuring organ and Hammond, complex arrangements, and long suites (most notably "Raymond's Road").

Track listing

Personnel
Beggars Opera
 Martin Griffiths - vocals 
 Alan Park - organ 
 Raymond Wilson - drums 
 Ricky Gardiner - lead guitar 
 Marshall Erskine - bass guitar

References

Beggars Opera albums
1970 debut albums
Albums produced by Phil Coulter
Albums produced by Bill Martin (musician)
Vertigo Records albums